Olearia strigosa, commonly known as bristly daisy bush, is a species of flowering plant in the family Asteraceae and is endemic to the south-west of Western Australia. It is an erect shrub with linear leaves and blue or purple, daisy-like inflorescences.

Description
Flowering occurs from January to May and the fruit is an achene, the pappus with 30 to 56 long bristles and 4 to 10 short ones.

Taxonomy
This daisy was first formally described in 1845 by Joachim Steetz who gave it the name Eurybia strigosa in Johann Georg Christian Lehmann's Plantae Preissianae. In 1867 George Bentham changed the name to Olearia strigosa in Flora Australiensis. The specific epithet (strigosa) means "strigose".

Distribution and habitat
Bristly daisy bush grows with herbs and sedges in the understorey of low woodland in the southern part of the Swan Coastal Plain and the Jarrah Forest bioregions of south-western Western Australia.

Conservation status
Olearia strigosa is listed as "Priority Three" by the Government of Western Australia Department of Biodiversity, Conservation and Attractions, meaning that it is poorly known and known from only a few locations but is not under imminent threat.

References

Taxa named by Joachim Steetz
Plants described in 1845
Flora of Western Australia
strigosa